The International Junior B Hockey League (IJBHL) was a Canadian Junior ice hockey league in the Northern Ontario and Northern Michigan regions.  The league was controlled by the Northern Ontario Hockey Association and the Canadian Amateur Hockey Association and was founded in 1965 and lasted until 1981.

History
The International Junior B Hockey League was created in 1965 to fill the gap in the region between the Northern Ontario Junior Hockey Association and the Thunder Bay Junior A Hockey League.  The league encompassed the Greater-Sault Ste. Marie region to the West in Wawa plus the edge of Northern Michigan.  John Reynolds was league commissioner in the early years.

The league became very significant after the NOJHA folded in 1972 and competed against the NOHA Jr. B Hockey League and the Northwestern Ontario Junior Hockey League for Northern Ontario hockey supremacy.

In 1972, the Memorial Cup-eligible NOJHA folded.  The league's top two teams, the Sudbury Wolves and Sault Ste. Marie Greyhounds, moved to the Ontario Major Junior Hockey League and the North Bay Trappers moved to the newly formed Ontario Provincial Junior A Hockey League.  This left the Chelmsford Canadiens and dozens of junior-capable players without a league.  This caused the expansion of the infantile NOHA Jr. B Hockey League who took the IJBHL to task in their first three years to win three straight NOHA titles from the IJBHL.  In 1973, the Coniston Cubs defeated the Soo Indians, in 1974 the Rayside Balfour Canadians defeated the Wawa Travellers, and in 1975 the Onaping Falls Flyers defeated the Blind River Beavers.

In 1978, the NOHA Junior B Hockey League was promoted to Junior A and became the Northern Ontario Junior Hockey League.

Teams

Marty Pavelich Trophy Playoff Champions

External links
NOJHL's Official Website

Defunct ice hockey leagues in Ontario
Sport in Northern Ontario
Defunct junior ice hockey leagues in Canada
Sports leagues established in 1965
Sports leagues disestablished in 1981
1965 establishments in North America
1981 disestablishments in North America